Gromek is a gender-neutral Slavic surname that may refer to
Admiral Gromek, character from The Emissary (Star Trek: The Next Generation)
Hermann Gromek, an East German security officer played by Wolfgang Kieling in Alfred Hitchcock's 1966 thriller, "Torn Curtain."
Carl Gromek, Florida State Seminoles baseball pitcher
Janusz Gromek (born 1956), Polish politician
Joseph R. Gromek (born 1947), Warnaco Group CEO, Tumi Inc. Chairperson of Board of Directors
Józef Gromek (1931–1985), Polish chess player 
L. Gromek, character from El ministerio del tiempo
Lazlo Gromek, character from Knock on Wood (film)
Ryszard Gromek, Czerwono-Czarni drummer
Steve Gromek (1920–2002), American baseball pitcher
Wiktor Gromek (born 2005), Polish Leicester City F.C. footballer

Polish-language surnames